Galleh Khar or Gallehkhar or Galeh Khar may refer to:
 Galleh Khar, Khuzestan
 Galeh Khar, West Azerbaijan